Tyson Scott Nash (born March 11, 1975) is a Canadian former ice hockey left winger.  He announced his retirement on September 11, 2008.  He last played for the Nippon Paper Cranes in Japan during the 2007–08 season.

Hockey
Nash spent his first five seasons in the NHL with the St. Louis Blues, in his early years, in the role of a pest, specializing in drawing penalties from members of opposing teams. He spent the next two seasons with the Phoenix Coyotes.  He was traded to the Toronto Maple Leafs from the Coyotes for Mikael Tellqvist and a 4th round draft pick on November 28, 2006.

On November 22, 2007, he signed with the Nippon Paper Cranes in Japan.  The Cranes finished the season in second place, behind the Oji Eagles.

He played his junior career with the Kamloops Blazers where he was part of the team which won three Memorial Cups.  He is one of only three players to have won three Memorial Cups with the same team (Ryan Huska and Darcy Tucker are the others).

Nash was hired as the Arizona Coyotes' TV analyst alongside Matt McConnell following his retirement. Nash came under fire when he applauded the one sided assault of an Anaheim Ducks player with his gloves still on during a 5-0 Coyotes loss on April 1, 2022.

Career statistics

References

External links
 
 
 

1975 births
Living people
Arizona Coyotes announcers
Canadian ice hockey left wingers
Ice hockey people from Edmonton
Kamloops Blazers players
National Hockey League broadcasters
Nippon Paper Cranes players
Phoenix Coyotes players
Raleigh IceCaps players
St. Louis Blues players
San Antonio Rampage players
Syracuse Crunch players
Toronto Marlies players
Vancouver Canucks draft picks
Worcester IceCats players